Asif Aziz is a London-based billionaire entrepreneur and philanthropist. As the founder and Chief Executive of Criterion Capital, he is known for owning and operating key landmarks including the London Trocadero and Criterion Building in Piccadilly Circus. Aziz is also the founder of family based charity the Aziz Foundation.

Early life
Born in Malawi in 1967, Aziz moved to London at the age of six. He acquired his first London property in the 1980s, whilst still at school. He graduated from the British American College London with a business baccalaureate.

Career
Aziz worked for property investment company Morgan Grenfell Laurie before moving back to Angola, Africa in 1993 where he made his fortune through the setting up of two food manufacturing businesses, including Golfrate Angola, which he sold in 2005. 
That same year he returned to the UK and established Criterion Capital, which acquired the London Trocadero leisure complex, the London Pavilion (1 Piccadilly Circus) and The Criterion Building (1 Jermyn Street). Today, Criterion Capital are the biggest landowner in the Leicester Square - Piccadilly Circus corridor.

As CEO of Criterion Capital, he owns and manages a £3.6bn property portfolio across London and the South East of England, including 15 commercial buildings in the West End of London, the Docklands and Croydon.

In 2005, the Evening Standard reported that he bought his first property aged 16 at an auction he visited with a relative, after saying he was 18. He bid £1.9m for the building opposite South Kensington tube station.

Through Criterion, unveiled plans to turn the Trocadero into a 500-room pod hotel in 2009. In 2014, plans were also unveiled to open a TK Maxx retail store on the Trocadero site, though the media reported possible opposition from the Crown Estate.

Aziz is reputed to be Britain's seventh richest Muslim in the UK. The Daily Telegraph ranked Asif Aziz as number 12 out of 40 in its list of successful entrepreneurs.

Aziz has been criticised by the political magazine Private Eye for using companies registered in the Isle of Man to buy properties in London, especially pubs, and then close them down to replace them with more lucrative housing developments.

Charity
In 2015, Aziz founded The Aziz Foundation with the aim to help the educational pursuits of the most underprivileged and disadvantaged communities across Britain. Currently, the Foundation is engaged in narrowing the postgraduate attainment gap by encouraging British Muslims to pursue higher education through its Masters scholarship programme.  Through continued development and education, the programme equips its scholars with the skills and social capital they require to achieve their full potential and inspire positive change within their communities.
To date, the Aziz Foundation has funded over 350 British Muslim changemakers, with 200 of these awards being allocated in the 2020-21 academic year.

In addition to the foundation, Aziz has a number of charitable interests, both internationally and domestically. Internationally this includes supporting the Thokomala project in South Africa, which looks after orphans from the AIDS epidemic; supporting the Mosaic Future primary school mentoring programme through Criterion Capital, Seeing is Believing; a charity that helps sight restorations as well as helping to prevent other causes of preventable blindness; Camfed, the international organisation dedicated to eradicating poverty in Africa through the education of girls and the empowerment of young women; Unicef the international aid agency; The Olive Tree – a scholarship scheme aims to support outstanding young Palestinians and Israelis during their degree studies; and The Next Step Diversity Mark, a means for organisations to demonstrate their commitment to generating and supporting diversity at all levels.

In the UK, he is the founder of the Aziz Foundation, which has supported community initiatives including Citizens UK, The Prince's Trust's Mosaic programme and Refugee Action.

See also
Criterion Capital

References

External links
Aziz Foundation website
 Asif Aziz's biography

Living people
1967 births
English people of Indian descent
Malawian chief executives
Malawian emigrants to the United Kingdom
Businesspeople from London